Carlos Evaristo is a Portuguese Canadian historian, archaeologist and author. He is also a television personality, historic and religious commentator for RTP and an executive producer for special projects at Estúdios Valentim de Carvalho. On October 25, 2019, Evaristo was appointed by the Brazilian government to serve as the Honorary Consul of Brazil in Fátima, Portugal.

Media
Evaristo presented a weekly popular spot on the morning show A Praça da Alegria on RTP 1 concerning historical and religious subjects.

Culture
Evaristo is the president of the Oureana Foundation and the founder of the Portuguese chapter of the Real Instituto de Arqueologia Sacra.

Religion 

An October 11, 1993, interview was broadcast for the purpose of public clarification following malicious attacks on Evaristo by Message of Fátima conspiracy theorists.

Evaristo is a member of the Blue army and the archivist of the Domus Pacis in Fatima. He is also National Coordinator for the Alliance of the Holy Family Foundation International and a director of the Portuguese Shroud Research Centre and founder of FIDES: Federação-Internacional-de-Estudos-Sindonologicos. Under the Patronage of the Portuguese and Italian Royal Houses, Evaristo chairs the FIDES King Umberto II Award for Shroud Research and Devotion.

In 1988, he co-founded Saint Anne's Oratory Apostolate for Holy Relics with his wife. It is headquartered at the Regalis Lipsanotheca in Ourém Castle that houses one of the world's largest relic collections started by the Evaristo family.

Further reading

 Evaristo, Carlos; Os Condes de Ourém e os Barões e Viscondes de Vila Nova de Ourém. Fátima: Regina Mundi Press, 2006. 272 p.
 Evaristo, Carlos; Duas entrevistas com a Irmã Lúcia. Prefácio de Monsenhor José Geraldes Freire. Fátima: Regina Mundi Press, 1998.
 Evaristo, Carlos; Quadros da História de Ourém: a jóia da coroa portuguesa. Fátima: Regina Mundi Press, 2000. 656 p.
 Evaristo, Carlos; A Real Irmandade de São Miguel da Ala: História e estatutos: a devoção portuguesa a São Miguel Anjo de Portugal e da Paz. Fátima: Regina Mundi Press, 2002. 127 p.
 Evaristo, Carlos; Os Condes de Ourém e os Barões e Viscondes de Vila Nova de Ourém Fátima: Regina Mundi Press, 2006. 272 p.

References

External links
 Carlos Evaristo Channel on YouTube
WorldCat Identities

20th-century Portuguese historians
Living people
Canadian people of Portuguese descent
Year of birth missing (living people)
21st-century Portuguese historians